Procambarus leitheuseri, sometimes called the Coastal Lowland cave crayfish, is a species of troglobite crayfish in the family Cambaridae. It is endemic to Hernando and Pasco counties, Florida and is listed as an endangered species on the IUCN Red List.

References

Cambaridae
Endemic fauna of Florida
Freshwater crustaceans of North America
Cave crayfish
Taxonomy articles created by Polbot
Crustaceans described in 1983
Taxa named by Horton H. Hobbs Jr.